Eric Winston White (born 26 October 1958) is an English former footballer who made 529 league appearances with 13 different clubs in a 17-year career in the Football League.

He began his career with Leicester City, before signing with Hereford United three years later. In 1983, he ended up at Bury following brief stays at Hong Kong Rangers, Chesterfield, Port Vale and Stockport County. He helped the "Shakers" to win promotion out of the Fourth Division in 1984–85. Loaned out to Rochdale, he was allowed to sign with Colchester United on a free transfer in March 1987. He was sold on to Burnley for £17,500 in October 1988, before he joined West Bromwich Albion for a £35,000 fee in 1991. He was released from his contract in October 1992, and then had brief spells with Bury, Doncaster Rovers, Carlisle United, and Wigan Athletic.

Career
White began his career at Leicester City, who finished 11th in the First Division in 1976–77 under Jimmy Bloomfield's stewardship. The "Foxes" were relegated in last place in 1977–78 under Frank McLintock, before finishing just three places and three points above the Second Division relegation zone in 1978–79 under Jock Wallace, Jr. White then left Filbert Street for Hereford United for a fee of £15,000 in March 1979. He played a total of 208 league and cup games for the "Bulls", scoring 24 goals. In 1979, he played in a benefit match for West Bromwich Albion's Len Cantello, that saw a team of white players play against a team of black players.

Manager Frank Lord failed to take the club out of the Fourth Division re-election zone in 1979–80 or 1980–81, though the Edgar Street outfit did reach tenth in 1981–82, before finishing bottom of the Football League in 1982–83 under Tommy Hughes. White left Hereford in 1983, moving to Hong Kong to turn out for Hong Kong Rangers of the Hong Kong First Division League. After returning to his native England he had trials with Chesterfield and Port Vale, appearing as a substitute for the "Valiants" in a 2–1 Third Division defeat at Newport County on 29 October 1983, before leaving Vale Park two days later. He moved on to Bury via Stockport County, both of whom were in the Fourth Division. The "Shakers" finished 15th in 1983–84 under Jim Iley, before clinching the fourth automatic promotion place in 1984–85 under Martin Dobson. White left Gigg Lane for a loan spell at Rochdale, who were struggling back in the Fourth Division. Bury held on to their Third Division status in 1985–86 and 1986–87.

White signed with Colchester United on a free transfer in March 1987. He made 78 appearances in all competitions, including 50 in 1987–88, before joining Burnley for a fee of £17,500 in October 1988. During his time at Layer Road the club slipped down the Fourth Division, as Mike Walker was replaced by Roger Brown and then Steve Foley. He scored twice against Colchester on 10 February 1989, hitting six goals in 39 games for the "Clarets" in 1988–89; the Lancashire Telegraph ran with the headline "Winston turns on the black magic". Manager Brian Miller had left Turf Moor the previous month, and the club improved under new boss Frank Casper. White scored nine goals (including six penalties) in 50 appearances in 1989–90. He then hit six goals in 40 games in 1990–91, helping the club to the play-offs, where they were beaten by Torquay United. Before the play-offs came he was signed by West Bromwich Albion for a £35,000 fee.

The "Baggies" slipped out of the Second Division in 1990–91, and missed out on the Third Division play-offs by one place and three points in 1991–92 under Bobby Gould. White was released from his contract at The Hawthorns by new boss Osvaldo Ardiles in October 1992. He returned to former club Bury, who were managed by his former boss Mike Walsh, and saw the 1992–93 season out with brief spells at Doncaster Rovers, Carlisle United and Wigan Athletic.

Style of play
White was a crowd pleaser who "played football with a smile on his face, and terrorised teams with his tricky wing play."

Post-retirement
After retiring from football, White co-owned a restaurant in Padiham, and was later appointed Regional Sales Manager at Life Fitness. After gaining a bachelor's degree in Business and also studying for an MBA he now works with a worldwide soccer agency and also runs a health and fitness consultancy business.

Career statistics
Source:

Honours
Bury
Football League Fourth Division fourth-place promotion: 1984–85

References

1958 births
Living people
Footballers from Leicester
English footballers
Association football midfielders
Black British sportspeople
Leicester City F.C. players
Hereford United F.C. players
English expatriate footballers
Expatriate footballers in Hong Kong
Hong Kong Rangers FC players
Chesterfield F.C. players
Port Vale F.C. players
Stockport County F.C. players
Bury F.C. players
Rochdale A.F.C. players
Colchester United F.C. players
Burnley F.C. players
West Bromwich Albion F.C. players
Doncaster Rovers F.C. players
Carlisle United F.C. players
Wigan Athletic F.C. players
English Football League players
Hong Kong First Division League players
English expatriate sportspeople in Hong Kong